Robert Scott "Bob" Lefsetz (born April 22, 1953) is an American music industry analyst and critic. He is the author of The Lefsetz Letter, an email newsletter and a blog.

Background
Lefsetz grew up in Fairfield, Connecticut and is a graduate of Middlebury College where he majored in art history. He moved to Los Angeles in the 1970s. After earning his J.D. degree from Southwestern Law School, Lefsetz worked as an entertainment business attorney, and briefly as head of Sanctuary Music's American division. He has worked as a consultant to major record labels. He is based in Santa Monica, California.

The Lefsetz Letter
The newsletter has tens of thousands of subscribers. From April 2013 through December 2015, Lefsetz wrote a weekly column for Variety's  weekly print edition and its website.

Controversy
In 2007, Lefsetz and Kid Rock engaged in an email feud but have since reconciled.

In 2009, Lefsetz and Kiss bassist Gene Simmons exchanged insults via e-mail and in person at the Canadian Music Week conference, and they debated officially at the Royal York Hotel in Toronto.

In 2010, American singer-songwriter Taylor Swift released a song titled "Mean" which is rumored to be about Lefsetz and his critical review about her performance at the 52nd Grammy Awards with rock and roll legend Stevie Nicks.

References

External links
Lefsetz Letter

Living people
1953 births
American bloggers
Middlebury College alumni
Writers from Fairfield, Connecticut